Hopatcong is a borough in Sussex County, in the U.S. state of New Jersey. As of the 2020 United States census, the borough's population was 14,362, a decrease of 785 (−5.2%) from the 2010 census count of 15,147, which in turn reflected a decline of 741 (−4.7%) from the 15,888 counted in the 2000 Census.

History

The town of Hopatcong has a rich history, given its relationship with New York City. It borders Lake Hopatcong, a partially man-made lake that is now a source of much recreation and desirable real estate, and is the biggest lake in New Jersey. An amusement park, called "Bertrand's Island", sprang up and was accessible via the lake, trolley or by car through Mount Arlington. The construction of Interstate 80, a highway that stretches from Teaneck, New Jersey, all the way across the country to San Francisco, California, triggered rapid growth in New York City's suburbs and led to Hopatcong becoming a permanent residential community.
The area had been called "Brookland" in the 19th century and the lake that was expanded to become Lake Hopatcong had been known as "Great Pond" or "Brookland Pond". During the 1830s, the name of the community had been modified to "Brooklyn", to match the spelling of the city on New York's Long Island. Hopatcong was originally established as the Town of Brooklyn on April 2, 1898, from portions of Byram Township. On March 22, 1901, the Borough of Hopatcong replaced Brooklyn. In 1922, residents of Byram Cove, Northwood, and other areas to the west of the original land area of the borough, voted to leave Byram Township and join Hopatcong, leaving the Borough with its current borders.

While the origin of the borough's name is unclear, it is said to derive from Native American phrases variously meaning "stone over water" or "pipestone", among other variations.

Geography
According to the United States Census Bureau, the borough had a total area of 12.35 square miles (31.99 km2), including 10.89 square miles (28.21 km2) of land and 1.46 square miles (3.78 km2) of water (11.83%).

Unincorporated communities, localities and place names located partially or completely within the borough include Bear Pond, Byram Cove, Cow Tongue Point, Davis Cove, Glasser, Hendersons Cove, Roseville, Sharps Rock and Sperry Springs.

Hopatcong borders Byram Township, Sparta Township and Stanhope in Sussex County; and Jefferson Township, Mount Arlington and Roxbury Township in Morris County.

Demographics

2010 census

The Census Bureau's 2006–2010 American Community Survey showed that (in 2010 inflation-adjusted dollars) median household income was $85,730 (with a margin of error of +/− $4,570) and the median family income was $95,962 (+/− $5,996). Males had a median income of $60,533 (+/− $5,094) versus $47,515 (+/− $7,133) for females. The per capita income for the borough was $36,033 (+/− $2,406). About 1.6% of families and 3.0% of the population were below the poverty line, including 3.8% of those under age 18 and 4.3% of those age 65 or over.

2000 census
As of the 2000 United States census there were 15,888 people, 5,656 households, and 4,236 families residing in the borough. The population density was 1,449.7 people per square mile (559.7/km2). There were 6,190 housing units at an average density of 564.8 per square mile (218.1/km2). The racial makeup of the borough was 93.10% White, 1.95% African American, 0.11% Native American, 1.80% Asian, 1.42% from other races, and 1.61% from two or more races. Hispanic or Latino of any race were 5.99% of the population.

There were 5,656 households, out of which 38.7% had children under the age of 18 living with them, 62.3% were married couples living together, 8.3% had a female householder with no husband present, and 25.1% were non-families. 18.6% of all households were made up of individuals, and 4.2% had someone living alone who was 65 years of age or older. The average household size was 2.81 and the average family size was 3.24.

In the borough the population was spread out, with 26.4% under the age of 18, 7.1% from 18 to 24, 34.8% from 25 to 44, 24.9% from 45 to 64, and 6.8% who were 65 years of age or older. The median age was 36 years. For every 100 females, there were 102.0 males. For every 100 females age 18 and over, there were 100.1 males.

The median income for a household in the borough was $65,799, and the median income for a family was $73,277. Males had a median income of $47,083 versus $34,238 for females. The per capita income for the borough was $26,698. About 2.2% of families and 3.0% of the population were below the poverty line, including 2.7% of those under age 18 and 5.8% of those age 65 or over.

Government

Local government
Hopatcong is governed under the borough form of New Jersey municipal government, one of 218 municipalities (of the 564) statewide, making it the most common form of government in New Jersey. The governing body is comprised of the Mayor and the Borough Council, with all positions elected at-large on a partisan basis as part of the November general election. The Mayor is elected directly by the voters to a four-year term of office. The Borough Council is comprised of six members elected to serve three-year terms on a staggered basis, with two seats coming up for election each year in a three-year cycle. The Borough form of government used by Hopatcong is a "weak mayor / strong council" government in which council members act as the legislative body with the mayor presiding at meetings and voting only in the event of a tie. The mayor can veto ordinances subject to an override by a two-thirds majority vote of the council. The mayor makes committee and liaison assignments for council members, and most appointments are made by the mayor with the advice and consent of the council.

, the Mayor of Hopatcong Borough is Republican Michael Francis, whose term of office ends December 31, 2023. Members of the Hopatcong Borough Council are Bradley Hoferkamp (R, 2022), Jennifer Johnson (R, 2022), Dawn Roberts (R, 2024), Richard Schindelar (R, 2023), Ryan Smith (R, 2024) and John Young (R, 2023).

In December 2016, the Borough Council chose Michael Francis from three candidates nominated by the Republican municipal committee to fill the seat expiring in December 2019 that had been held by Sylvia Petillo until she resigned from office the previous month in advance of taking a seat on the Sussex County Board of Chosen Freeholders; Francis will serve on an interim basis until the November 2017 general election, when voters will choose a candidate to serve the balance of the term of office. In turn, Bradley Hoferkamp was chosen to fill the council seat vacated by Francis, including the three-year term that Francis had won in November 2016; Hoferkamp will also serve until November 2017, when the balance of the term will be filled by a candidate selected by voters.

In May 2014, the Borough Council appointed Frank Padula to fill the vacancy of Richard Hoer, who had resigned the previous month. Padula served on an interim basis until the November 2014 general election, when he ran unopposed and won the balance of the term of office expiring in December 2016.

Federal, state, and county representation
Hopatcong is located in the 7th Congressional District and is part of New Jersey's 24th state legislative district. 

 

Sussex County is governed by a Board of County Commissioners whose five members are elected at-large in partisan elections on a staggered basis, with either one or two seats coming up for election each year. At an annual reorganization meeting held in the beginning of January, the board selects a Commissioner Director and Deputy Director from among its members, with day-to-day supervision of the operation of the county delegated to a County Administrator. , Sussex County's Commissioners are 
Commissioner Director Anthony Fasano (R, Hopatcong, term as commissioner and as commissioner director ends December 31, 2022), 
Deputy Director Chris Carney (R, Frankford Township, term as commissioner ends 2024; term as deputy director ends 2022), 
Dawn Fantasia (R, Franklin, 2024), 
Jill Space (R, Wantage Township, 2022; appointed to serve an unexpired term) and 
Herbert Yardley (R, Stillwater Township, 2023). In May 2022, Jill Space was appointed to fill the seat expiring in December 2022 that had been held by Sylvia Petillo until she resigned from office.

Constitutional officers elected on a countywide basis are 
County Clerk Jeffrey M. Parrott (R, Wantage Township, 2026),
Sheriff Michael F. Strada (R, Hampton Township, 2022) and 
Surrogate Gary R. Chiusano (R, Frankford Township, 2023). The County Administrator is Gregory V. Poff II, whose appointment expires in 2025.

Politics
As of March 2011, there were a total of 9,554 registered voters in Hopatcong, of whom 1,917 (20.1% vs. 16.5% countywide) were registered as Democrats, 3,242 (33.9% vs. 39.3%) were registered as Republicans and 4,383 (45.9% vs. 44.1%) were registered as Unaffiliated. There were 12 voters registered as Libertarians or Greens. Among the borough's 2010 Census population, 63.1% (vs. 65.8% in Sussex County) were registered to vote, including 81.3% of those ages 18 and over (vs. 86.5% countywide).

In the 2012 presidential election, Republican Mitt Romney received 3,285 votes (55.0% vs. 59.4% countywide), ahead of Democrat Barack Obama with 2,560 votes (42.9% vs. 38.2%) and other candidates with 117 votes (2.0% vs. 2.1%), among the 5,973 ballots cast by the borough's 9,652 registered voters, for a turnout of 61.9% (vs. 68.3% in Sussex County). In the 2008 presidential election, Republican John McCain received 3,941 votes (54.7% vs. 59.2% countywide), ahead of Democrat Barack Obama with 3,096 votes (43.0% vs. 38.7%) and other candidates with 117 votes (1.6% vs. 1.5%), among the 7,199 ballots cast by the borough's 9,571 registered voters, for a turnout of 75.2% (vs. 76.9% in Sussex County). In the 2004 presidential election, Republican George W. Bush received 4,003 votes (59.4% vs. 63.9% countywide), ahead of Democrat John Kerry with 2,616 votes (38.8% vs. 34.4%) and other candidates with 98 votes (1.5% vs. 1.3%), among the 6,739 ballots cast by the borough's 9,182 registered voters, for a turnout of 73.4% (vs. 77.7% in the whole county).

In the 2013 gubernatorial election, Republican Chris Christie received 71.3% of the vote (2,906 cast), ahead of Democrat Barbara Buono with 24.9% (1,016 votes), and other candidates with 3.8% (153 votes), among the 4,110 ballots cast by the borough's 9,777 registered voters (35 ballots were spoiled), for a turnout of 42.0%. In the 2009 gubernatorial election, Republican Chris Christie received 3,089 votes (63.2% vs. 63.3% countywide), ahead of Democrat Jon Corzine with 1,260 votes (25.8% vs. 25.7%), Independent Chris Daggett with 441 votes (9.0% vs. 9.1%) and other candidates with 72 votes (1.5% vs. 1.3%), among the 4,888 ballots cast by the borough's 9,454 registered voters, yielding a 51.7% turnout (vs. 52.3% in the county).

Education
Students in public school for pre-kindergarten through twelfth grade are served by the Hopatcong Public Schools. As of the 2020–21 school year, the district, comprised of four schools, had an enrollment of 1,449 students and 146.1 classroom teachers (on an FTE basis), for a student–teacher ratio of 9.9:1. To address a significant reduction in state aid, Hudson Maxim School, which had served grades Pre-K–1, was closed at the end of the 2018–19 school year. For the 2019–2020 school year, the grades were reconfigured across the remaining four school facilities. Schools in the district (with 2020–21 enrollment data from the National Center for Education Statistics) are 
Tulsa Trail Elementary School with 249 students in grades Pre-K–1, 
Durban Avenue School with 227 students in grades 2–3, 
Hopatcong Middle School with 459 students in grades 4–7 and 
Hopatcong High School with 499 students in grades 8–12.

Transportation

No Interstate, U.S., state or major county highways enter Hopatcong. The only roads serving the borough are minor county routes, such as County Route 605 and County Route 607, and municipally-maintained streets.

Events 
Hopatcong holds annual American Power Boat Association (APBA) boat races that attract the local residents to a day at the lake.  Hopatcong is also known for its yearly "Hopatcong Days" that offer a weekend of events that include a parade, and an array of festivities in Modick Park, sponsored by the local Business Association and including an annual Soap Box Derby and Car Show.

The Lake Hopatcong Historical Museum holds a variety of local historical artifacts.

Notable people

People who were born in, residents of, or otherwise closely associated with Hopatcong include:

Joe Cook (1890–1959), vaudeville actor who lived on the shores of Lake Hopatcong in a house he named "Sleepless Hollow"
 Lotta Crabtree (1847–1924), actress
 Joe Martinek (born 1989), leading football rusher in New Jersey high school history
 Hudson Maxim (1853–1927), inventor and chemist who is the namesake of the district's Hudson Maxim School
 Dave Yovanovits (born 1981), former NFL offensive lineman

References

External links

 Hopatcong Borough website
 Hopatcong Public Schools
 The Township Journal, community newspaper
 
 Data for Hopatcong Public Schools, National Center for Education Statistics

 
1898 establishments in New Jersey
Borough form of New Jersey government
Boroughs in Sussex County, New Jersey
Populated places established in 1898